Punggol Point LRT station is an elevated Light Rail Transit (LRT) station on the Punggol LRT line West Loop in Punggol, Singapore. The station was named after Punggol Point. In September 2022, it was the least used station in terms of ridership.

The station along Punggol Way near the junction of Northshore Crescent, around a cluster of landed property on the north-eastern tip of the island of Singapore. It is situated just a couple of minutes from NorthPoint Cottages, Northshore Bungalows, and the Saint Francis Xavier Major Seminary.

Etymology

The name is taken from Punggol Point. Despite its name, it is not located within or near the vicinity of Punggol Point. It is, however, the closest station to it.

History
On 19 December 2016, SBS Transit announced that the station will be opened for the convenience of residents staying along Ponggol Seventeenth Avenue. The station opened on 29th of that month.

See also
 Punggol Road End

References

External links

Railway stations in Singapore opened in 2016
Punggol
LRT stations in Punggol
Light Rail Transit (Singapore) stations
Railway stations in Punggol